The Dublin-Meath rivalry is a Gaelic football rivalry between Irish county teams Dublin and Meath, who first played each other in 1894. It is considered to be one of the biggest rivalries in Gaelic games. Dublin's home ground is Parnell Park and Meath's home ground is Páirc Tailteann, however, many of their championship meetings have been held at neutral venues, usually Croke Park.

While Dublin have the highest number of Leinster titles and Meath are ranked second on the roll of honour, they have also enjoyed success in the All-Ireland Senior Football Championship, having won 35 championship titles between them to date.

Regarded as one of the greatest rivalries in Gaelic football, a Leinster final between Dublin and Meath is regarded as a special occasion.

Statistics

All-time results

Legend

Senior

References

Meath
Meath county football team rivalries